Alfred von Planta  (1 April 1857, in Tamins – 2 March 1922, in Davos) was a Swiss politician and President of the Swiss National Council (1913/1914).

External links 
 
 
 

1857 births
1922 deaths
People from Imboden District
Swiss nobility
Swiss Calvinist and Reformed Christians
Liberal Party of Switzerland politicians
Members of the National Council (Switzerland)
Presidents of the National Council (Switzerland)
Alfred